Walter Pearless (28 March 1879 – 29 December 1940) was an Australian-born New Zealand cricketer who played for Otago. He was born in Gippsland and died in Richmond, New Zealand.

Pearless made two first-class appearances for the team during the 1904–05 season, scoring 17 runs on his debut in an innings victory against Wellington, and on his second appearance, scored 8 and 4 not out.

See also
 List of Otago representative cricketers

External links
Walter Pearless at Cricket Archive 

1879 births
1940 deaths
New Zealand cricketers
Otago cricketers
Australian emigrants to New Zealand